Edward Dunsterville was Archdeacon of Kilmacduagh  from 1630 until 1637.

Dunsterville was educated at Trinity College, Dublin.  He was a Prebendary of Ferns Cathedral from 1637 to 1638.

His son was Archdeacon of Cloyne  from 1661 until 1665.

References

Archdeacons of Kilmacduagh
Alumni of Trinity College Dublin
17th-century Irish Anglican priests